KSSR-FM 95.9 FM is a radio station licensed to Santa Rosa, New Mexico.  The station broadcasts a variety format and is owned by Esquibel LLC.

Programming
KSSR offers a variety of shows from a variety of genres including AT40 with Ryan Seacrest, Bob Kingsley's Country Top 40 on Saturdays, Explicitly Old School with T-Boz weekdays, and even a Spanish-speaking radio show on Sunday mornings.

References

External links
KSSR-FM's official website

SSR